is a 1993 Japanese film directed by Yōjirō Takita.

Cast
 Hiroyuki Sanada 
 Ittoku Kishibe
 Kyūsaku Shimada
 Yū Hayami
 Tsutomu Yamazaki

Reception
It was chosen as the 4th Best Film at the 15th Yokohama Film Festival. Hiroyuki Sanada also won the Award for Best Actor.

References

External links
 

Films directed by Yōjirō Takita
1993 films
Southeast Asia in fiction
1990s Japanese films